Lisa Phillips may refer to:

 Lisa Phillips (museum director) ( 1975–2013), American museum director, curator, and author
 Lisa Phillips (civil servant) ( 2016–2018), Governor of Saint Helena, Ascension and Tristan da Cunha
 Lisa Phillips (lawn bowls) (born 1993), Australian lawn bowler
 Lisa Philipps ( 1988–2017), Canadian law professor